Hood County is a county located on the Edwards Plateau in the U.S. state of Texas. As of the 2020 census, the population was 61,598. Its county seat is Granbury. The county is named for John Bell Hood, a Confederate lieutenant general and the commander of Hood's Texas Brigade.

Hood County is part of the Dallas-Fort Worth-Arlington metropolitan statistical area and the Granbury micropolitan area.

History
Hood County was formed in 1866 from portions of Johnson County. It was named after John Bell Hood, a general of the Confederate Army and commander of Hood's Texas Brigade.

Geography

Major highways
  U.S. Highway 377
  State Highway 144

Adjacent counties
 Parker County (north)
 Johnson County (east)
 Somervell County (south)
 Erath County (west)
 Palo Pinto County (northwest)

Demographics

Note: the US Census treats Hispanic/Latino as an ethnic category. This table excludes Latinos from the racial categories and assigns them to a separate category. Hispanics/Latinos can be of any race.

As of the census of 2000, 41,100 people, 16,176 households, and 12,099 families were residing in the county.  The population density was 98 people/sq mi (38/km2).  The 19,105 housing units averaged 45/sq mi (18/km2).  The racial makeup of the county was 94.77% White, 0.33% African American, 0.82% Native American, 0.31% Asian,  2.44% from other races, and 1.32% from two or more races.  About 7.24% of the population were Hispanic or Latinos of any race.

Of the 16,176 households, 28.80% had children under 18 living with them, 63.60% were married couples living together, 7.80% had a female householder with no husband present, and 25.20% were not families. About 21.60% of all households were made up of individuals, and 10.00% had someone living alone who was 65  or older.  The average household size was 2.50, and the average family size was 2.88. As of the 2010 census,  about 3.4 same-sex couples per 1,000 households were in the county.

In the county, the age distribution was 23.60% under  18, 6.70% from 18 to 24, 25.20% from 25 to 44, 26.60% from 45 to 64, and 17.90% who were 65  or older.  The median age was 42 years. For every 100 females, there were 96.20 males.  For every 100 females age 18 and over, there were 94.10 males.

Males had a median income of $38,662 versus $23,723 for females. The per capita income for the county was $22,261. About 6.00% of families and 8.50% of the population were below the poverty line, including 10.00% of those under age 18 and 7.40% of those age 65 or over.

Media

Hood County is part of the Dallas/Fort Worth television media market in North Central Texas. Local news media outlets are KDFW-TV, KXAS-TV, WFAA-TV, KTVT-TV, KERA-TV, KTXA-TV, KDFI-TV, KDAF-TV, KFWD-TV, and KDTX-TV.
Hood County is served by two newspapers, Hood County Free Press, an online daily publication, and the biweekly Hood County News https://hcnews.com.

Education
These school districts serve Hood County:
 Bluff Dale ISD (mostly in Erath County)
 Godley ISD (mostly in Johnson County, small portion in Tarrant County)
 Granbury ISD (small portion in Johnson, Parker Counties)
 Lipan ISD (small portion in Erath, Palo Pinto, and Parker Counties)
 Tolar ISD

Politics
Hood County has become a strongly Republican county since 1980.

Communities

Cities
 Cresson (partly in Parker and Johnson counties)
 DeCordova
 Granbury (county seat)
 Lipan
 Stockton Bend
 Tolar

Census-designated places
 Canyon Creek
 Oak Trail Shores
 Pecan Plantation

Unincorporated communities
 Acton
 Paluxy
 Thorp Spring

See also

 List of museums in North Texas
 National Register of Historic Places listings in Hood County, Texas
 Recorded Texas Historic Landmarks in Hood County

References

External links
 Hood County Lawyer- Daniel Webb Site has some good links about Hood County.
 Hood County government's website
 
 

 
1866 establishments in Texas
Populated places established in 1866
Granbury micropolitan area